Rimertown, also referred to as Rimer, is an unincorporated community in northeastern Cabarrus County, North Carolina, United States. Named after the Rimer family, one of the early settlers to the area, it is surrounded by Concord, Kannapolis, Rockwell, and Mount Pleasant and lies in the Mt. Pleasant school district.

Notes

Unincorporated communities in Cabarrus County, North Carolina
Unincorporated communities in North Carolina